Prince Edward Island National Park is a National Park of Canada located in the province of Prince Edward Island. Established in 1937, the park's mandate includes the protection of many broad sand beaches, sand dunes and both freshwater wetlands and saltmarshes. The park's protected beaches provide nesting habitat for the endangered piping plover; the park has been designated a Canadian Important Bird Area.

An extension was added to the park in 1998 when an extensive sand dune system in Greenwich was transferred from the provincial government to Parks Canada. The Prince Edward Island National Park also includes Green Gables, which was the childhood inspiration for the Anne of Green Gables novels by author Lucy Maud Montgomery, as well as Dalvay-by-the-Sea, a Victorian era mansion currently operated as an inn.

In 1999, the Canadian Nature Federation identified Prince Edward Island National Park as being the most endangered in the national park system, based on human impact. The park also experiences severe coastal erosion as a result of winter storms and its vulnerable shoreline.

The park was the subject of a short film in 2011's National Parks Project, directed by John Walker and scored by Chad Ross, Sophie Trudeau and Dale Morningstar.  Part of the Jezero crater on Mars was informally named after the park.

Wildlife
Animals that inhabit this national park are coyotes, red foxes, raccoons, beavers, minks, and weasels. Numerous birds roam in this park including species of various herons, ducks, owls, cranes, plovers, grouses, jays, falcons, geese, hawks, sandpipers and eagles.

Gallery

See also

 National parks of Canada
 List of national parks of Canada
 List of parks in Prince Edward Island

References

External links

 Official site at Parks Canada

National parks in Prince Edward Island
Parks in Queens County, Prince Edward Island
Parks in Kings County, Prince Edward Island
Important Bird Areas of Prince Edward Island
Protected areas established in 1937